José María Larrañaga (born 7 July 1963) is a Peruvian freestyle swimmer. He competed in two events at the 1980 Summer Olympics.

References

External links
 

1963 births
Living people
Peruvian male freestyle swimmers
Olympic swimmers of Peru
Swimmers at the 1980 Summer Olympics
Place of birth missing (living people)
20th-century Peruvian people